Hal Partenheimer is a retired American soccer midfielder who spent one season in the North American Soccer League and two in the Major Indoor Soccer League.

The son of Stan Partenheimer, and grandson of Steve Partenheimer, Hal Partenheimer graduated from Sewickley Academy in 1974.  He is a member of the Sewickley Athletic Hall of Fame.  Partenheimer attended James Madison University where he played on the men's soccer team.  In 1979, he signed with the Detroit Express of the North American Soccer League, but saw no first team time during the outdoor season.  He played three games during the 1979-1980 indoor season before being sent to the Pittsburgh Spirit for cash.  He finished the season with the Spirit, then spent a year not playing soccer after the Spirit went into hiatus.  In the fall of 1981, he was among the first players re-signed by the Spirit when they resumed operations.  In 1983, he played for the Pennsylvania Stoners of the American Soccer League.

References

External links
NASL stats

1957 births
Living people
People from Latrobe, Pennsylvania
Soccer players from Pennsylvania
American soccer players
American Soccer League (1933–1983) players
Detroit Express players
James Madison Dukes men's soccer players
Major Indoor Soccer League (1978–1992) players
North American Soccer League (1968–1984) indoor players
Pennsylvania Stoners players
Pittsburgh Spirit players
Sewickley Academy alumni
Association football defenders